Kumawu is one of the constituencies represented in the Parliament of Ghana. It elects one Member of Parliament (MP) by the first past the post system of election. Kumawu is located in the Sekyere Afram Plains District  of the Ashanti Region of Ghana.

Boundaries 
The seat is located within the Sekyere Afram Plains District of the Ashanti Region of Ghana.

Members of Parliament

Elections

See also
List of Ghana Parliament constituencies
List of political parties in Ghana

References 

Parliamentary constituencies in the Ashanti Region